Mosede Fort, located in Mosede, Denmark is a coastal fort, part of Tunestillingen (the Tune Line), built in the years before and during the First World War, to protect the Bay of Køge from possible German naval invasions. It is now a protected area with a museum, grassy fields for recreation and a restaurant.

History

Construction
Construction began in 1913, but was first battle-ready in July 1916. The battery was originally dubbed "Mosede Battery" but was popularly called Mosede Fort. It was fully manned until 1922, and was thereafter only used for drills.

World War 2
The Fort was re-manned in 1939, but it was captured by the Germans in 1940, who used it as an observations post and prison camp. When Denmark was liberated, the government continued to use the fort as a detention camp until 1947. It was then handed over to Hjemmeværnet, who used it for shooting practice and drills until 1970, when it got overrun and "liberated" by the local population. It has since then been a park open for public.

Mosede Fort Today
Mosede Fort is now being preserved by Greve Kommune; it is very popular as a recreational area for ballgames, picnics and other pastime activities. It also has a restaurant. In 2010 Greve Kommune along with Greve Museum, began to restore and insulate the old fort so it could be dehumidified sufficiently, in order to store historical objects safely. It was planned to open Denmark's first "Denmark during World War 1" museum with the inauguration on 1 August 2014 - 100 anniversary of Germany's declaration of war on Russia. On 30 September 2012, during the celebration of Copenhagen's fortification, a 120mm Howitzer was presented by Greve Museum as the emblem for Mosede Fort. The museum opened 6 August 2014, with HRH Prince Joachim of Denmark attending.

Equipment
The fort was equipped with the most modern artillery, a generator, a water-supply, central-heating, telephone, kitchen and bomb-shelters capable of keeping 150 men.
The Fort was armed with:
 6 × 120mm L/15, rapid firing Howitzer (M.1914). Aimed towards the sea
 4 × 75mm L/30 (M.1914). For coastal, land, and air defense
 4 × 37mm Maxim gun. For land defense
 31 Madsen machine guns. For land defense
 A number of searchlights, including 2 × 90mm

Buildings
 The Fort has three smaller bunkers, situated on the beach, together with a medium bunker placed south
 Four bomb shelters, one of which is underground
 Seven major gun positions
 Four minor gun positions
 Look-out station
 A Casemate with officers' room, barracks, telephone central, ammunition rooms, and ammo elevators leading to the large gun-emplacements

Citations

References

Forts in Denmark
Government buildings completed in 1913
Fortifications of Copenhagen
1913 establishments in Denmark
Greve Municipality